Kévin Diogo (born 8 July 1991) is a French professional footballer who plays as a midfielder.

Club career
Diogo made his full professional debut in a 2–1 Ligue 2 victory over Tours in August 2013, coming on the pitch at the last minute as a substitute for Anthony Lippini.

He joined Championnat National side Châteauroux on a loan deal on 9 September 2015.

He joined Super League club Kerkyra on a 2,5 years contract on 20 February 2017.

Career statistics
.

References

External links
 
 
 Kévin Diogo foot-national.com Profile

1991 births
Living people
Sportspeople from Sens
French footballers
Association football midfielders
INF Clairefontaine players
Paris Saint-Germain F.C. players
Stade Malherbe Caen players
FC Sens players
Clermont Foot players
LB Châteauroux players
PAE Kerkyra players
Les Herbiers VF players
FC Chamalières players
Ligue 2 players
Super League Greece players
Championnat National players
French expatriate sportspeople in Greece
Expatriate footballers in Greece
Association football defenders
French expatriate footballers
Footballers from Bourgogne-Franche-Comté